The Prentiss Bridge is a historic covered bridge in Langdon, New Hampshire. Built about 1874, it spans Great Brook just east of the modern alignment of Chester Turnpike, which it carried until it was bypassed by a modern bridge in 1955. At  in length, it is the shortest 19th-century covered bridge built for use on a public roadway in New Hampshire that is still standing. The bridge was listed on the National Register of Historic Places in 1973.

Description and history
Its exterior is finished in vertical board siding, with a ventilation gap between the siding and the gabled roof.

Bridges are known to have stood on the site since at least 1791, when the town requested a report on a bridge standing here. In 1794, the town appropriated funds to build a bridge near the mill of Jabez Rockwell and John Prentiss. In 1874, the town appropriated $1,000 to replace that structure; the present bridge was presumably built soon afterward. It remained in service on the Chester Turnpike until 1955. It is now open to foot traffic.

See also

National Register of Historic Places listings in Sullivan County, New Hampshire
List of New Hampshire covered bridges
List of bridges on the National Register of Historic Places in New Hampshire

References

Covered bridges on the National Register of Historic Places in New Hampshire
Bridges completed in 1874
Bridges in Sullivan County, New Hampshire
National Register of Historic Places in Sullivan County, New Hampshire
Road bridges on the National Register of Historic Places in New Hampshire
Wooden bridges in New Hampshire
Lattice truss bridges in the United States
1874 establishments in New Hampshire